Christina Jane Nigra (born February 27, 1975) is an American actress who performed in The Sword and the Sorcerer, Twilight Zone: The Movie, Cloak & Dagger, and Out of This World.

Filmography
1981: Goliath Awaits (TV movie) as Beth
1981: Trapper John, M.D. (TV series) as Little Girl / Susie
1982: The Sword and the Sorcerer as Young Elizabeth
1983: Twilight Zone: The Movie (Segment #4) as Little Girl
1983: General Hospital (TV series) (episode #1.5342) as Little Girl
1984: Cloak & Dagger as Kim Gardener
1985: Lots of Luck (TV movie) as Trish Maris
1985: Mr. Belvedere (TV series) as Rona
1986: The Wizard (TV series) as Carrie
1987-1991: Out of This World (TV series) (78 episodes) as Lindsay Selkirk
1991: The Trials of Rosie O'Neill (TV series) as Kim's friend
1991: Top of the Heap (TV series) as Candi
1992: Harry and the Hendersons (TV series) as Danielle

References

External links
 
 

American child actresses
American film actresses
Living people
1975 births
People from Agoura Hills, California
Actresses from California
American television actresses
20th-century American actresses
21st-century American women